Aloy is a fictional character and protagonist of the 2017 video game Horizon Zero Dawn and its sequel Horizon Forbidden West. In the games' post-apocalyptic tribal setting, she is born in 3021, raised as an outcast, and trains as a warrior in order to win a ritual competition to discover her mother's identity. After narrowly evading an assassination attempt, she embarks on a journey to stop a cult that worships an artificial intelligence bent on the world's destruction, while also hunting machines that have grown hostile to humans. She has been critically praised for her design and characterization. She is voiced by American voice actress Ashly Burch and modeled after Dutch actress Hannah Hoekstra.

Character development
Aloy was created as a character who could provide many tactical options in battle. As a "hunter at heart", she has little compassion for machines beyond a "hunter's respect". She also has a gritty personality, disliking "comforts or ease", and tends to be "very forthright and blunt, sometimes even confrontational" in how she addresses issues. Guerrilla Games always envisioned the game as starring a strong female character, with game director Mathijs de Jonge citing Sarah Connor from Terminator, Ellen Ripley from Alien, and Ygritte from Game of Thrones as influences. Sony decided to do rigorous market testing, believing that adding a female lead might be a "risk", but approved her as the lead role. The developers were aware of the strong female character cliche and tried to make a more human character with a more interesting personality. Aloy's physical likeness was based on the Dutch actress Hannah Hoekstra.

Appearances

Horizon Zero Dawn
Aloy is first introduced as an infant who has been entrusted to Rost's care, a man who has been cast out by the Nora tribe. Six years later, while exploring on her own, she falls into a forbidden bunker that was created by ancient humans. While trying to escape from the destroyed facility, she discovers an augmented reality device known as a Focus before being rescued by Rost. Despite his misgivings, Rost allows her to keep the Focus, which she soon develops an affinity for. The next morning, while learning to hunt with Rost, she uses the Focus to rescue Teb, an injured member of the Nora tribe who has recklessly fallen into the path of machines. Aloy expresses the desire to learn the identity of her mother, and Rost suggests training to compete in the Proving, a coming-of-age ritual that would not only allow her entry into the Nora, but give her the answers she seeks as a boon if she wins.

The game skips forwards twelve years to when she has become a skilled warrior and huntress due to her intensive training. She attends the Proving, winning the competition and being declared a Nora. Before she can ask about her parents, the tribe is attacked by a group of cultists led by the fanatical Helis, who seeks to kill Aloy. Most of her fellow warriors are murdered, but Helis hesitates when stabbing Aloy and is attacked by Rost, who then sacrifices himself to protect her from a blast. When she comes to inside All-Mother Mountain, one of the tribe's elders explains that Aloy was actually found in front of another bunker inside the mountain, and their disagreement over whether she was a good or evil omen led to her exile. However, her Focus reveals that Helis was given orders along with a picture of an older woman who looks just like her.

Aloy is declared a Seeker and sets out to avenge the attack on the tribe. Eventually, she is contacted by a man named Sylens, who reveals that the older woman is Dr. Elisabet Sobeck. Her genetic profile allows her to access the headquarters of Faro Automated Solutions, where she sees that Elisabet was a skilled scientist who was called in to try to stop a rogue swarm of self-replicating combat robots that used biomass as fuel and ultimately consumed all life on Earth thanks to the company's CEO, Ted Faro, refusing to allow any backdoor access into the machines. She then sets out to discover what Elisabet had planned to do, what was referred to as "Project Zero Dawn."

Eventually, Aloy discovers that Zero Dawn was a terraforming system whose development involved deceiving the global human populace into sacrificing itself in a futile attempt to stop the swarm to provide time to complete it. The system would restore the human species and other life after shutting down the swarm. However, a mysterious signal attacked Zero Dawn's AI, GAIA, forcing her to self-destruct and unshackling her component processes. With nothing to protect humanity from the rogue AI of HADES, initially created as an emergency "reset switch" for the planet, GAIA was forced to order ELEUTHIA, a sub-function tasked with maintaining the artificial wombs, to clone Elisabet using DNA stored for the defunct "Lightkeeper Protocol", predicting that her genes would cause her to become the world's savior once again. Aloy was brought outside the facility by a robot, leading the elders to believe she had mysteriously appeared there. 

Reaching the entrance to GAIA Prime, Aloy witnesses a series of significant damages caused by GAIA's self-destruction and is skeptical that GAIA could ever be repaired. While exploring the Zero Dawn facility, Aloy also learns that Dr. Sobeck sacrificed herself to close a malfunctioning vent and save the project from the encroaching all-consuming robots. Upon realizing this, Aloy sets out to find the Master Override that can shut down HADES. With the help of Sylens, she obtains the Override and confronts HADES, shutting it down in the nick of time. In an ending scene, she is seen finding the body of Dr. Sobeck and getting closure in the search for her origins.

The Frozen Wilds
Intrigued by rumors of a new wave of dangerous machines at the edge of the Banuk land, Aloy took a detour from her mission to explore the Cut. After learning more about the "Spirit" from Ourea, Aloy attempts to fulfil her request by saving the mysterious entity. Soon afterwards, she teams up with Ourea's brother, Aratak. Subsequently, they head to an ancient ruin at Thunder's Drum, the Firebreak facility to free the "Spirit". Later, Aloy discovers that HEPHAESTUS, one of GAIA's sub-functions, took control of the facility from an unknown remote location, enslaving the previous governing AI, CYAN, who Ourea earlier deemed as the voice of the "Spirit". After Aloy, Ourea and Aratak defeat the enemy, they head to the facility's core. Ourea sacrifices herself to finish the override, with Aloy later consoling Aratak for his loss. They quickly flee from the collapsing facility, leaving Ourea's body behind. After a successful escape, Aloy and Aratak meet again at Ourea's Retreat to discuss matters with CYAN. Prior to finishing the last mission at the Cut, Aloy attempts to converse with Aratak, who requests for her help to eliminate the remaining threats caused by HEPHAESTUS. After finishing the mission, Aloy returns to Ourea's apprentice Naltuk, who thanks her for assisting the Banuk. He then bids her with a respectful farewell.

Horizon Forbidden West
Horizon Forbidden West continues the story of Aloy half a year after the events of Zero Dawn; a young huntress of the Nora tribe sent on a quest to a mysterious frontier spanning Utah to the Pacific coast to find the source of a mysterious plague that kills all it infects. On her journey across the uncharted lands of the Forbidden West, she encounters hostile regions filled with natural threats and ravaged by massive storms, dangerous enemies and deadly machines, both new and old. As Aloy attempts to explore the wider and deeper parts of the Forbidden West, she discovers a vast array of diverse environmental ecosystems, including lush valleys, dry deserts, snowy mountains, tropical beaches and ruined cities, both above and below the water.

Horizon Call of the Mountain 
The game's story follows Ryas, a former Shadow Carja rebel who is sentenced to atone for his crimes by joining an expedition sent to investigate a new threat to the Sundom. During his journey, Ryas meets numerous new and returning characters, including franchise protagonist Aloy.

In other media 
Aloy has appeared in other media outside of the Horizon games. She was a playable character in the PlayStation 4 version of Monster Hunter: World and makes a cameo appearance in Astro's Playroom. 
Aloy was added to Fortnite Battle Royale on April 15, 2021, for the Chapter 2, Season 6 "Primal" event. A limited time "Aloy Cup" was available to PlayStation players, while a "Team Up!" mode with Lara Croft from Tomb Raider was added. She also got an extra style called Ice Hunter, which is only available to players that own a PlayStation 5. but can be used across all consoles when unlocked. In September 2021, Aloy was given out as a free collaboration character for PS4 and PS5 players of the game Genshin Impact, while players on other platforms received her for free in October 2021. In the game, she is a Bow user of the Cryo element.

Reception
Peter Tieryas of Kotaku praised the character of Aloy, finding the scene where Aloy talks to her father's grave moving in part due to how "real" their relationship felt and how it shows how things have changed for Aloy since her childhood. Malindy Hetfield of Polygon praised Aloy as "inspiring and captivating", but also called her "not particularly relatable" compared to the game's other female characters due to her "flawlessness". Aloy's story about her origins resonated with Sam Loveridge of GamesRadar+ and inspired her to seek out her own birth parents. Lucas Sullivan of the same site called her "one of gaming's greatest female leads". She was ranked as one of the best video game characters of the 2010s by Polygon staff by Colin Campbell praising the character by stating that "She's pragmatic but compassionate, iron-willed but open-minded. In a 31st-century world with its own norms and taboos, particularly around gender, Aloy refuses to let anyone else tell her how to live." Paste magazine writer Holly Green included Aloy as the best new game characters of 2017. TheGamer also included Aloy on their "Iconic Video Game Characters", stating that "Aloy is one of the best protagonists of the last decade, of which there are many to choose from, mostly because of her strong-willed nature and ability to act strong in difficult situations."

Ashly Burch, the voice actress for Aloy, won an award for "best gaming performance" at the 35th Golden Joystick Awards. She thanked the developers, saying that playing the character made her a "braver and stronger woman", and that she hoped Aloy would be inspiring to other women.

References

Adoptee characters in video games
Clone characters in video games
Female characters in video games
Fictional archers
Fictional exiles
Fictional hunters in video games
Horizon Zero Dawn
Orphan characters in video games
Sony Interactive Entertainment protagonists
Video game characters introduced in 2017
Video game mascots
Woman soldier and warrior characters in video games
Fictional machine hunters